Higher Education in Kraków takes place in 10 university-level institutions with about 120,000 to over 170,000 students (based on years and different data providers) and 10,000 faculty, as well as in a number of non-public colleges.

Public institutions of higher education 
 Jagiellonian University
 AGH University of Science and Technology
 Cracow University of Technology
 Cracow University of Economics
 Academy of Music in Kraków
 Pedagogical University of Cracow
 Agricultural University of Kraków
 Academy of Fine Arts in Kraków
 Ludwik Solski Academy for the Dramatic Arts
 The University School of Physical Education in Krakow
 Pontifical University of John Paul II

Non-public colleges 
 Akademia Lospuma Training Institute
 Tischner European University
 Jesuit University of Philosophy and Education Ignatianum
 Andrzej Frycz Modrzewski Krakow University
 Krakowska Wyższa Szkoła Promocji Zdrowia
 Małopolska Wyższa Szkoła Zawodowa
 Wyższa Pedagogiczna Szkoła Zawodowa im. Św. Rodziny
 Wyższa Szkoła Bezpieczeństwa Publicznego i Indywidualnego "Apeiron"
 Wyższa Szkoła Ekonomii i Informatyki w Krakowie 
 Wyższa Szkoła Handlowa w Krakowie (closing) 
 Wyższa Szkoła Ochrony Środowiska, Turystyki i Rekreacji
 Wyższa Szkoła Ubezpieczeń
 Wyższa Szkoła Zarządzania i Bankowości w Krakowie

See also 
 Culture of Kraków
 VIII Prywatne Akademickie Liceum Ogólnokształcące w Krakowie

Notes and references

 
Krakow
 
Kraków